"Deez nuts" or deez nutz is a euphemism and slang term for testicles.

Deez Nuts may also refer to:

 Deez Nuts (band), Australian hardcore punk band
 Deez Nuts (satirist) (born Brady C. Olson, 1999/2000), satirical candidate for the 2016 United States presidential election
 "Deez Nuts", a song by A.L.T. from the 1993 album Stone Cold World
 "Deez Nuts", a song by Mr. Serv-On from the 2001 album Take a Sip

Other uses
 "Deeez Nuuuts", a song by Dr. Dre from the 1992 album The Chronic

See also